Cumbancha is a record label, booking agency and music publisher based in Charlotte, Vermont. The company was founded by ethnomusicologist and music producer Jacob Edgar in 2006. In 2007, Cumbancha Music Publishing was established to expand opportunities for artists, helping them license songs to various movies, television programs, and advertisements, including Boyhood, Grey's Anatomy, and High Maintenance. Cumbancha Booking was founded in 2010 to book tours for artists on and off the label, bringing them to venues such as Hollywood Bowl, Montreal Jazz Festival, New Orleans Jazz & Heritage Festival, Lincoln Center, Central Park SummerStage, and Austin City Limits. Artists on the label include The Idan Raichel Project, Habib Koité and Bamada, Rupa & the April Fishes, Sierra Leone's Refugee All Stars, The Touré-Raichel Collective, and Lakou Mizik, among many others. The name "Cumbancha" derives from the Cuban word of West African derivation meaning an impromptu musical gathering or party.

Awards

Cumbancha was awarded the Top Label Award by WOMEX in 2008.

Location

Cumbancha headquarters is located in Charlotte, Vermont, in a refurbished, solar-powered barn, which also contains the Putumayo World Music Archive. Sharing the property is Lane Gibson Recording & Mastering.

Releases

See also
 List of record labels
 Putumayo World Music

References

External links
 

American record labels
Record labels established in 2006
2006 establishments in Vermont
Buildings and structures in Charlotte, Vermont
World music record labels
Companies based in Vermont